This is a list of the largest shopping centers in Germany, starting with a minimum of 5,000 square metres of Gross Leasable Area (GLA).

References
Germany's best malls, Immobilien Zeitung

Coralldot

Germany

Sho